Nathan Jay Young-Coombes (born 15 January 2003) is an English professional footballer who plays as a forward for  club Brentford. He is a product of the Crystal Palace, Chelsea and Rangers academies and was capped by England at youth level.

Club career

Early years 
A forward, Young-Coombes joined the Crystal Palace Academy at the age of seven. He moved on to the Chelsea Academy in 2017 and to the Rangers Academy in February 2019. During nearly  years at Auchenhowie, Young-Coombes won the 2019 Al Kass International Cup and 2018–19 Scottish Youth Cup with the youth teams and progressed into the B team. He was released when his contract expired at the end of the 2020–21 season.

Brentford 
On 9 June 2021, Young-Coombes signed a three-year contract, with an option of a further year, with the B team at newly-promoted Premier League club Brentford. He transferred for an undisclosed fee, with the contract effective 1 July 2021. Prolific goalscoring for the B team saw Young-Coombes called into the first team squad during the 2021–22 season and he remained an unused substitute during eight matches, before finally making his senior debut as a late substitute for Mathias Jensen after 87 minutes of a 3–0 Premier League win over Southampton on 7 May 2022. He was a part of the B team's 2021–22 London Senior Cup-winning squad and his 34 B team goals were recognised with the Brentford B Player of the Year award.

On 29 July 2022, Young-Coombes joined League Two club AFC Wimbledon on a season-long loan. Beginning the 2022–23 season in a substitute role, Young-Coombes scored the first senior goals of his career with three in as many matches in mid-August 2022. A quad injury suffered during a 2–0 defeat to Northampton Town on 13 September 2022 ended Young-Coombes' run in the team and he returned to Brentford for treatment. Young-Coombes returned to match play on Boxing Day and made three further appearances before suffering "a knock" in training, which led to his recall from the loan on 20 January 2023.

International career 
Young-Coombes was capped by England at U15, U16 and U17 level.

Personal life 
Young-Coombes attended Woodcote High School and Strathallan School.

Career statistics

Honours 
Brentford B

 London Senior Cup: 2021–22

Individual
 Crystal Palace Academy Player of the Month: November 2016
 Brentford B Player of the Year: 2021–22

References

External links

Nathan Young-Coombes at brentfordfc.com

2003 births
Living people
People from Sutton, London
People educated at Strathallan School
People educated at Woodcote High School
English footballers
Association football forwards
Rangers F.C. players
Brentford F.C. players
AFC Wimbledon players
Premier League players
English Football League players